The Hollywood Palladium is a theater located at 6215 Sunset Boulevard in Hollywood, California. It was built in a Streamline Moderne, Art Deco style and includes an  dance floor including a mezzanine and a floor level with room for up to 4,000 people.  The theater was listed on the National Register of Historic Places in 2016.  The Palladium was designated Los Angeles Historic Cultural Monument No. 1130 on September 28, 2016.

History
Los Angeles Times publisher Norman Chandler funded the construction of the art deco Hollywood Palladium at a cost of $1.6 million in 1940. It was built where the original Paramount lot once stood between Argyle and El Centro avenues, and was operated by film producer Maurice Cohen. The dance hall was designed by Gordon Kaufmann, architect of the Greystone Mansion, the Los Angeles Times Building and the Santa Anita Racetrack in Arcadia. He was also the architect for the Hoover Dam and early Caltech dorms.

The ballroom opened on October 31, 1940 with a dance featuring Tommy Dorsey and his Orchestra and band vocalist Frank Sinatra. It had six bars serving liquor and two more serving soft drinks and a $1 cover charge and a $3 charge for dinner.

During World War II, the Palladium hosted radio broadcasts featuring Betty Grable greeting servicemens' song requests. Big Band acts began losing popularity in the 1950s, causing the Palladium to hold charity balls, political events, auto shows, and rock concerts. In 1961, it became the home of the long-running Lawrence Welk Show.

From 1955–1976, the venue was the scene of Latin Music Orchestras for ragers sponsored by radio personality Chico Sesma titled Latin Holidays,” featuring childhood friend  Ray Vasquez Recording Artist, Lead Vocalist and Trombonist. The Tito Puente Orchestra performed regularly between 1957-1977 to sold-out houses of 5000.

President John F. Kennedy attended a dinner given in his honor by the California Democratic Party at the Palladium on November 18, 1961.

In 1964, it was announced that none of the jazz bands scheduled were to be paid and a riot ensued after the show was cancelled.

The Joe Loco Orchestra and show performed on the March 1965 Latin Holiday with singer/dancer Josephine "Josie" Powell.

Pop Expo '69, referred to as a "teenage fair," was a youth-oriented event held from 28 March to 6 April 1969 at the Palladium, and included performances by The Jimi Hendrix Experience and the MC5.

In 1973, Stevie Wonder performed with Taj Mahal in what was advertised as an "Afrocentric concert" to benefit African refugees.

Beginning in the 1980s and 90s, punk rock, rap and heavy metal concerts started to be booked at the venue. Several violent disturbances resulted, eventually leading to the Palladium closing for eight weeks, starting in February 1993.

Since 1985, the theater has been owned by Palladium Investors Ltd., a privately held group. Curfews were implemented in 1993 and a show by Marky Mark and the Funky Bunch was called off because of a brawl that occurred a few nights earlier. It was also used for Hollywood celebrity parties.

Renovation and reopening
In 2007, the owners agreed to a long-term lease to operate, manage and exclusively book the Hollywood Palladium with Live Nation, a Los Angeles-based company.

The Palladium reopened with a Jay-Z concert on October 15, 2008 after a year-long, multimillion-dollar renovation by Live Nation. The renovation included an overhaul of the venue's interior and exterior, a new dance floor, expanded concessions, upgraded restrooms and improvements to the stage infrastructure. Jay-Z performed for nearly an hour-and-half, backed by an eight-piece band and DJ AM, who played his first show after surviving a plane crash in South Carolina. The Hollywood Palladium was also used as the memorial service site for DJ AM on September 3, 2009.

For the 2008–2009 season, a yearlong table for four cost $30,000.

Residential expansion
The Los Angeles City council approved an expansion of the Palladium property parking lot in March 2016. The plan consists of two 28-story residential towers that surrounds the historic music venue. The Towers were designed by Stanley Saitowits of Natoma Architects for developer Crescent Heights. The "L" shaped design resembles and echoes the Streamline Moderne - art deco design of the Palladium.

The local AIDS Healthcare Foundation (AHF) filed a lawsuit in 2016 citing over development and improper approval process. One of many local lawsuits filed by AHF president Michael Weinstein. In August 2018, the district court ruled all steps were taken during EIR/DEIR. The AHF filed an appeal. The AHF lost the appeal in November 2019 and Crescent Heights plans to proceed.

In popular culture
The Hollywood Palladium has been featured in many movies and TV shows over the years:The Day of the Locust (1975).
Part of the series finale of Adam-12 was filmed at the Palladium in 1975.  Officer Jim Reed, played by Kent McCord received the Los Angeles Police Department Police Medal of Valor award for saving the life of his on-screen partner, Officer Pete Malloy, played by Martin Milner.Skatetown, U.S.A. (1979).
The final concert scene in The Blues Brothers depicted as "Palace Hotel Ballroom". The exterior was actually the South Shore Country Club in Chicago. (1980).
Richard Pryor performed two dates in December 1981 and was filmed for the theatrical release Richard Pryor: Live on the Sunset Strip in March 1982.      
The A-Team (season 4) episode 6 "The Heart of Rock N' Roll" shows the theater for concerts by Rick James and Isaac Hayes(character C.J. Mack).
Keith Richards released a CD and DVD of his solo concert Live at the Hollywood Palladium, December 15, 1988.
 The punk band Bad Religion recorded Live at the Palladium in 2006, a collection from their two days of performances.
 Thrash Metal band Megadeth filmed a live DVD based on the 20th anniversary of their album Rust in Peace at The Palladium.
 Luna Sea performed their first American concert at the Palladium on December 4, 2010. It was recorded in 3D and released as both a live album and concert film, Luna Sea 3D in Los Angeles''.
In 2016 Dave Chappelle filmed his Netflix special at the Palladium.

See also

List of music venues in Los Angeles
National Register of Historic Places listings in Los Angeles
List of theatres in California
House Of Blues

References

External links 

Buildings and structures in Hollywood, Los Angeles
Music venues in Los Angeles
Concert halls in California
Culture of Hollywood, Los Angeles
Sunset Boulevard (Los Angeles)
1940 establishments in California
Streamline Moderne architecture in California
Theatres on the National Register of Historic Places in Los Angeles
Grammy Award venues
Theatres completed in 1940